On 26 June 2022, a stadium collapsed in El Espinal, Tolima Department, Colombia during a bullfight.

Chronology
The collapse occurred at the three-story wooden stand section filled with audience members. There were 800 people sitting in the collapsed section before the accident happened.

Casualties
A total of six people were killed and another 322 people were treated at local public and private hospitals.

Responses
President Iván Duque expressed his solidarity to all of the victims' families and ordered an investigation to the incident. President-elect Gustavo Petro urged for a ban to such events, citing that it was not the first time it happened.

See also
 List of structural failures and collapses

References

2022 disasters in Colombia
Construction accidents
Stadium collapse
Stadium disasters
Tolima Department
Man-made disasters in Colombia